Magerovski is a surname. Notable people with the surname include:

Mikhail Magerovski (born 1986), Russian figure skater
Sergei Magerovski (born 1980), Russian ice dancer

Slavic-language surnames